Dream of Reason is the debut and only studio album by Australian indie rock band, the Cairos, which was recorded in 2013 and released on the Island Records Australia label in May 2014. It appeared at No. 6 on the ARIA Hitseekers Albums chart.

Reception

Reviewed in Rolling Stone Australia at the time of release, Samuel J Fell rated Dream of Reason at three-and-a-half out-of four stars and explained, "The much anticipated debut LP from the Cairos is an epic sprawl of an album, a tour de force... these songs build and build before breaking over you, a strong psych flavour at the fore, they differ in that these tracks are somewhat gentler and more fluid. A bit more warmth has also been included." Milly Schultz-Boylen of the AU Review gave it 7.4 out-of 10 and found its tracks, "are well crafted, diverse and boast a sense of maturity that most debuts tend to lack."

Track listing

 "Obsession" (Jacob Trotter, Alistar Richardson, Alfio Alivuzza, Reuben Schafer)  – 3:46
 "Two Weeks of Eternity" (Trotter, Richardson, Alivuzza, Schafer)  – 3:31
 "Imaginations" (Trotter, Richardson, Alivuzza, Schafer)  – 3:09
 "Desire" (Trotter, Richardson, Alivuzza, Schafer)  – 3:28
 "Row of Homes" (Trotter, Richardson, Alivuzza, Schafer)  – 3:35
 "Insane" (Trotter, Richardson, Alivuzza, Schafer)  – 3:34
 "Fear of Madness" (Michael Bylund-Cloonan, Richardson, Alivuzza, Schafer)  – 4:26
 "Reasons" (Trotter, Richardson, Alivuzza, Schafer)  – 3:10
 "Good Days" (Trotter, Richardson, Alivuzza, Schafer)  – 4:42 
 "Perspective" (Trotter, Richardson, Alivuzza, Schafer)  – 3:34
Credits:

Personnel

 Alistar Richardson – vocals, guitar, Piano
 Alfio Alivuzza – vocals, lead guitar, computers
 Jacob Trotter – drums, percussion
 Reuben Schafer – bass
 Dayne Wotton – Trumpet
 Aurora Richardson – vocals
 DJ Sammy T – vibes
 Felipe Macia – ping pong
 Nick Didia – producer, "There's Been Surveys"

References

2014 albums
The Cairos albums